Estanislau is a Spanish and Portuguese male given name and surname (see Spanish naming customs) of Slavic origin. It derives from the Slavic Stanislav.

Given name

Politicians and statesmen
Estanislau da Silva (born 1952), East Timorese politician
Estanislao Figueras (1819–1882), Spanish politician
Estanislau Ruiz Ponsetti (1889–1967), Spanish engineer-turned-politician

Sports
Estanislau Basora (1926–2012), Spanish footballer
Estanis Pedrola (born 2003), full name Estanislau Pedrola Fortuny, Spanish footballer
Pamplona (footballer) (1904–1973), real name Estanislau de Figueiredo Pamplona, Brazilian footballer

Other
Estanislau Amadeu Kreutz (1928–2014), Brazilian Catholic bishop

Surname

Nobility
Infanta Adelgundes, Duchess of Guimarães (1858–1946), member of the House of Braganza
Princess Maria Theresa of Braganza (1881–1945), member of the House of Braganza and Infanta of Portugal

Sports
Pecka (footballer) (born 1989), real name Wellington de Jorge Estanislau Paeckart, Brazilian footballer

Other
Maria do Carmo Estanislau do Amaral (born 1959), Brazilian botanist, biologist, curator, and academic
Sérgio Estanislau do Amaral (1925–1996), Brazilian geologist

Spanish-language surnames